Red Deer Public Schools, also known as Public School District No. 104 or the Red Deer Public School District is responsible for public education in the city of Red Deer, Alberta. It governs a total of 28 schools; 13 elementary schools, 5 middle schools, 2 high schools and 8 alternative schools.

The high schools managed by the District are Hunting Hills High School and École Secondaire Lindsay Thurber Comprehensive High School. 

School districts in Alberta
Red Deer, Alberta